The Goff House is a historic house in Hamilton, Montana. It was built in 1910 for Daniel T. Goff, a businessman. Goff was the manager of the Bitter Root Land and Development Company. In 1920, the house was later acquired by Mabel Robbins, the widow of county clerk Fred Robbins. By the 1980s, it belonged to the Roy family.

The house was designed in the Colonial Revival and Queen Anne architectural styles. It has been listed on the National Register of Historic Places since August 26, 1988.

References

National Register of Historic Places in Ravalli County, Montana
Queen Anne architecture in Montana
Colonial Revival architecture in Montana
Houses completed in 1910
1910 establishments in Montana
Houses on the National Register of Historic Places in Montana
Houses in Ravalli County, Montana
Hamilton, Montana